Petersburg Area Transit is a bus system for the Petersburg Tri-cities Area. There are twelve color-coded routes that extend to such destinations as Virginia State University, Southpark Mall, and Fort Lee.

In a partnership with Greater Richmond Transit Company (GRTC), PAT provides express service to Downtown Richmond and any other destinations accessible by GRTC.  As of June 2009, in addition to the service to Richmond, Blackstone Bus Service offers and express route that travels from Blackstone, VA through Dinwiddie into the City of Petersburg. Dinwiddie Express utilizes the Petersburg Transit Station and normally parks in track 7. In 2020 Petersburg Area Transit suspended service to Central State Hospital and the Amazon Shipping facility in Dinwiddie due to lack of ridership. PAT hopes in the future there will be a need to restore this service. .

A centralized multi-modal transit hub for the PAT is now being used as the transfer point for all buses.  It is located at the corner of Union at Washington streets and Wythe at Union Streets

Routes
1 Washington Street/Summit Point Apartments
2 Halifax Street/Petersburg East Apartments
3 Lee Ave/Pecan Acres/Greenwood Farms
4 Virginia Avenue/Petersburg High School
5 Mall/Plaza via Sycamore Street
6 Ettrick/Virginia State University
8 Walnut Hill/Tanglewood Apartments/Food Lion/Battlefield Park/Oakhurst
9 South Crater Road/Walmart/Social Services
10 Southpark Mall/American Family Fitness/Wal-Mart/Enterprise Rental Car/Marshall's/Burlington
11 Blandford/Fort Lee/Hopewell Crossings
14 City of Hopewell/John Randolph Hospital/Hopewell High School
15 460/County Drive/Pine Tree Apartments
16 Richmond Express/McGuire Veterans Hospital/Downtown Richmond Virginia

Petersburg Area Transit In The News

In this section you will find links to new articles showcasing how PAT is on the move. We have rebranded and are Moving Forward

https://www.wtvr.com/news/local-news/petersburg-area-transit-unveils-new-bus-fleet

https://www.wtvr.com/news/local-news/peterburg-is-filling-up-propane-buses-for-2-15-a-galloon

https://www.progress-index.com/story/news/2021/03/25/petersburg-area-transit-director-koonce-talks-upcoming-changes/6990394002/

References

External links
Route Schedules, Time Points and Turn by Turn   http://www.petersburg-va.org/524/Routes

Bus transportation in Virginia